Oberer Hauenstein Pass (el. 731 m.) is a mountain pass in the Jura Mountains on the border between the cantons of Basel-Country and Solothurn in Switzerland.

It connects Balsthal and Waldenburg.

Hauenstein
Hauenstein
Mountain passes of Basel-Landschaft
Mountain passes of the canton of Solothurn
Basel-Landschaft–Solothurn border